was a Japanese politician and novelist active in Shōwa period Japan. Also known as "Inukai Ken", he was the third son of Prime Minister of Japan Inukai Tsuyoshi.

Biography 
Inukai was born in the Ushigome district of Tokyo. Although accepted into the Tokyo Imperial University’s School of Philosophy, he left without graduation. Interested in literature from his student days, he gravitated to the Shirakaba ("White Birch") literary society due to its liberal humanistic outlook. His works were influenced by Mushanokōji Saneatsu and Nagayo Yoshirō, and he became a member of the Japanese chapter of the International PEN.

He ran for a seat from the Tokyo 2nd District in the lower house of the Japanese Diet, under the Rikken Seiyūkai party in the 1930 General Election, and was elected twelve times holding a seat until his death in August 1960. Inukai was a press secretary under the first Konoe Fumimaro administration. He split with the Rikken Seiyūkai in 1939, joining a neutral faction led by Tsuneo Kanemitsu. He was held for questioning by the police in the Sorge Spy Incident.

As his father, Inukai Tsuyoshi, had always supported friendly relations with China, Inukai had contacts and good relations with Chinese politicians during the pre-war period. After his father's assassination in the May 15 Incident, he continued to strive for restoration of good Sino-Japanese relations, and especially provided support to the Wang Jingwei government in hopes that it would bring the stability that would allow Japan to withdraw its troops from the China quagmire. Thus throughout 1938 until the formation of the Reorganized National Government of the Republic of China in 1940, he negotiated with Gao Zongwu and Mei Siping to first come to a peace agreement with Chiang Kai-shek, and after failing that, to organize the defection of Wang Jingwei.

During the 1942 General Election, Inukai was reelected as an independent candidate opposing the Taisei Yokusankai.

After World War II in 1945, Inukai helped organize the Japan Progressive Party, of which he became chairman. The party merged with the Democratic Party, one of the forerunner of the Liberal Democratic Party in 1948. In 1952, under the 4th Yoshida Shigeru cabinet, Inukai became Minister of Justice. He continued in the same position in the 5th Yoshida cabinet in 1953. However, in the Shipbuilding Scandal of 1954 (under pressure from Prime Minister Yoshida), Inukai refused to approve of the prosecution of future prime minister Satō Eisaku, who had been indicted for corruption and misuse of public funds. Afterwards, he resigned as Justice Minister in protest.

Inukai died in 1960 at the age of 64, and his grave is located at Aoyama Cemetery in Tokyo. His son Yasuhiko was president of Kyodo News, and his daughter Michiko (d. 2017) was an author and a philanthropist.

References

Hoshii, Iwao. Japan's Pseudo-democracy. Routledge. (1993). 
Mitchell, Richard H. Political bribery in Japan. University of Hawaii Press (1996) 
Stockwin. J.A.A. Dictionary of the Modern Politics of Japan. Taylor & Francis. (2003).

Foototes

1896 births
1960 deaths
Writers from Tokyo
Politicians from Tokyo
University of Tokyo alumni
20th-century Japanese novelists
Members of the House of Representatives (Japan)
Ministers of Justice of Japan
Children of prime ministers of Japan
Rikken Seiyūkai politicians
20th-century Japanese politicians
Liberal Democratic Party (Japan) politicians
Takeru
Japan Progressive Party politicians